CA Boca Juniors has a professional beach soccer team based in Argentina.

Mundialito de Clubes 2012 squad

Coach: Gustavo Casado

Honours

International competitions
Mundialito de Clubes
 Quarter Final: 2012
 Group Stage: 2011

Beach soccer clubs